Heather Nicole Erickson (born May 9, 1993) is an American Paralympic sitting volleyball player.

Early life
Erickson was born in Eureka, California with a bone that prevented her leg from fully developing. In 2002, after 18 failed surgeries, her parents decided to have her right leg amputated. She received a prosthetic leg a month later. In 2011, she graduated from Jack Britt High School in Fayetteville, North Carolina.

Career
She started competing for Paralympic Games in 2007 where she won a silver medal for her participation at Sitting Volleyball Invitational. In 2008, she participated at World Organization Volleyball for Disabled where she won bronze medal and the same year got another silver one for her participation at 2008 Paralympic Games in Beijing, China. In 2010, Erickson won gold medal at Parapan American Championship which was held in Colorado and the same year got another gold and silver ones for a WOVD Championship and World Cup. In 2011 and 2012 respectively she won three gold medals at ECVD Continental Cup, Parapan American Zonal Championship, and Volleyball Masters. She also got 4th silver medal for her participation at 2012 Paralympic Games in London.

Erickson was a member of the USA Paralympic women's volleyball team which won the gold medal at the 2015 Parapan American Games in Toronto, at the 2016 Summer Paralympics in Rio de Janeiro, and at the 2020 Summer Paralympics in Tokyo.

Personal life and interests
Erickson likes to listen to such singers as Maroon 5 and Blake Shelton. She also enjoys watching such films as Game Plan, Gridiron Gang and August Rush. She likes to watch TV shows as well such as House, and WWE Raw. Her other hobbies are reading Nicholas Sparks books, and playing volleyball.

References

External links
 
 
 

1993 births
Living people
American sitting volleyball players
Women's sitting volleyball players
Paralympic volleyball players of the United States
Paralympic gold medalists for the United States
Paralympic silver medalists for the United States
Paralympic medalists in volleyball
Volleyball players at the 2008 Summer Paralympics
Volleyball players at the 2012 Summer Paralympics
Volleyball players at the 2016 Summer Paralympics
Volleyball players at the 2020 Summer Paralympics
Medalists at the 2008 Summer Paralympics
Medalists at the 2012 Summer Paralympics
Medalists at the 2016 Summer Paralympics
Medalists at the 2020 Summer Paralympics
Sportspeople from Eureka, California